Philip Harold Ross (19 December 1905 – 8 January 1981), was a decorated submarine commander during World War II who reached the rank of Rear Admiral in the United States Navy.

Admiral Philip Ross graduated from the United States Naval Academy with the class of 1927. After receiving his commission he became qualified on submarines, and in 1942 became qualified for command. He became the commander of the USS Halibut (SS-232) upon its commissioning 10 April 1942. His first two war patrols were unsuccessful. However, on his third war patrol he succeeded in sinking 30,280 tons of Japanese shipping and damaged an additional 8,000 tons, and he was awarded the Navy Cross. On his next war patrol, Ross sank 15,100 tons of Japanese shipping and damaged another 15,000 tons, for which he was awarded his second Navy Cross. These successful war patrols were reported in the media as an example of the success American submarines were having against the Japanese, and even gave him the nickname "Deadeye Phil." Ross retired from the U.S. Navy in 1957 after 30 years of service as a Rear Admiral.

References 

1905 births
1981 deaths
United States Navy rear admirals (upper half)
Submarine commanders
United States Naval Academy alumni
Recipients of the Navy Cross (United States)
United States Navy personnel of World War II
People from Kenai, Alaska